Mike Timm (May 20, 1937 – August 17, 2018) was an American politician who served in the North Dakota House of Representatives from the 5th district from 1972 to 1986 and from 1988 to 2006. He served as Speaker of the North Dakota House of Representatives from 1996 to 1998.

He died on August 17, 2018, in Minot, North Dakota at age 81.

References

1937 births
2018 deaths
Speakers of the North Dakota House of Representatives
Republican Party members of the North Dakota House of Representatives
People from Minot, North Dakota